Bechloul District is a district of Bouïra Province, Algeria.

Municipalities
The district is further divided into 5 municipalities:
Bechloul
El Asnam 
El Adjiba
Ahl El Ksar
Ouled Rached

Districts of Bouïra Province